The 16th BRDC International Trophy was a motor race run to Formula One rules, held on 2 May 1964 at the Silverstone Circuit, England. The race was run over 52 laps, and was won by Australian driver Jack Brabham in his own Brabham BT7.

Results

References
 "The Grand Prix Who's Who", Steve Small, 1995.
 "The Formula One Record Book", John Thompson, 1974.

BRDC International Trophy
BRDC International Trophy
BRDC
BRDC International Trophy